Sakura Park Station is a station on Line 1 and Line 3 of the Ningbo Rail Transit that started operations on 30 May 2014. It is located under Zhongshan Road in Yinzhou District of Ningbo City, Zhejiang Province, eastern China. In 2019, it became an interchange station between Line 1 and Line 3.

Exits

References

Railway stations in Zhejiang
Railway stations in China opened in 2014
Ningbo Rail Transit stations